Nikolai van der Heyde (23 January 1936 – 6 August 2020) was a Dutch film director and screenwriter. He directed seven films between 1966 and 1987. His 1968 film To Grab the Ring was entered into the 18th Berlin International Film Festival. Five years later, his film Love Comes Quietly was entered into the 23rd Berlin International Film Festival.

Selected filmography
 To Grab the Ring (1968)
 Love Comes Quietly (1973)
 Help! The Doctor Is Drowning (1974)
 Laat de Dokter maar Schuiven (1980)

References

External links

1936 births
2020 deaths
Dutch film directors
Dutch screenwriters
Dutch male screenwriters
People from Leeuwarden